Clerici is an Italian surname. 

Clerici family, noble family from Milan, originally from Domaso, Lake Como. 

Notable people with the surname include:

Alfonsa Clerici (1860-1930), Italian religious of the Sisters of the Most Precious Blood
Antonella Clerici, Italian television host
Carlo Clerici, Swiss bicycle racer
Columbo Clerici, Italian lawyer and author
Enrico Clerici (1862–1938), Italian mineralogist and geologist, creator of chemical Clerici solution.
Fabrizio Clerici (1913-1993), Italian painter
Gianfranco Clerici, Italian screenwriter
Gianni Clerici, Italian tennis player and commentator
Maurizio Clerici (1929-2013), Italian rower
Serena Clerici (born 1971), Italian voice actress
Sergio Clerici, Brazilian footballer
Mario Clerici, Italian immunologist

Building
 Palazzo Clerici, via Clerici, in Milan.
 Villa Clerici, in Niguarda quarter of Milan.
 Clerici Palace, in Castelletto Cuggiono.

Companies
 Coeclerici, company founded in Genoa in 1895 by Alfonso Clerici and Henry Coe.

See also
Clerici solution, a solution of thallium formate and thallium malonate in water

Italian-language surnames